Mali i Gjerë is a mountain in southern Albania. The highest peaks from north to south are Mali i Pusit, Mali i Frashërit and Mali i Nikollaqit.

On the eastern slope of the mountain is Gjirokastra while on the other side is Delvina.

Rivers
The mountain springs feed Bistrica river. Its most important tributary is from the Blue Eye, a large karst spring that is a popular destination because of the scenic surroundings.

Mountains of Albania